Scum Lake Airport, formerly , was located adjacent to Scum Lake in Chilcotin District, British Columbia, Canada.

References

Defunct airports in British Columbia
Cariboo Regional District